This article lists rolling stock of Società Veneta.  It is not complete.

Steam locomotives

Notes
Locotender in Italian means tank locomotive in English.

In 1915, locomotives were re-numbered in the following groups:
    1-139, for narrow-gauge locomotives
    140-199, for standard gauge tramway locomotives
    200-299, for four-coupled locomotives, e.g. 0-4-0
    300-399, for six-coupled locomotives, e.g. 0-6-0
    400-499, for eight-coupled locomotives, e.g. 0-8-0

There seem to have been a few departures from this system, possibly because of shortage of numbers in a particular group.

Diesel locomotives

Diesel railcars

Electric railcars

References

Further reading

    Giovanni Cornolò, La Società Veneta Ferrovie, 2ª ed., Ponte San Nicolò, Duegi editrice, 2005, .
    Nico Molino, Alessandro Muratori, Le ALn 668 e 663 per le ferrovie in concessione, in Mondo Ferroviario, vol. 10, n. 92, febbraio 1994, pp. 62-77, ISSN 0394-8854

Defunct railway companies of Italy
Transport in Veneto
Locomotives of Italy